Jules Remedios Faye (born 1958) is an American author, editor, letterpress printmaker, bookbinder, teacher, and creator of artists’ books. With husband Christopher Stern she established Stern & Faye Printers, a letterpress print shop & hand bookbindery located in Mt Vernon, WA. Faye teaches, curates and participates in bookarts exhibits and events throughout the Skagit Valley and Puget Sound area.

Selected works
 "The Café of the Beautiful Assassins." Fantasy Macabre issue 10 (1988) edited by Jessica Amanda Salmonson
 "The Promenade of Misshapen Animals." Fantasy Macabre, issue 11 (1988) 
 "Pandora Pandaemonia." In What Did Miss Darrington See? : An Anthology of Feminist Supernatural Fiction (1989) (Edited by Jessica Amanda Salmonson)
 "A Light from Out of Our Heart." In Tales By Moonlight II (1989) (Edited by Jessica Amanda Salmonson)
 Wisewomen and Boggy-Boos: A Dictionary of Lesbian Fairy Lore (1992) (Editor. With Jessica Amanda Salmonson)
 The Mysterious Doom: And Other Ghostly Tales of the Pacific Northwest (1992) (With Jessica Amanda Salmonson)

Selected artists' books 
 De Todos Corazon. (2015)
 The Infant Sun Within. (2012)
 Sacred Vehicle. (2012)
 Fallen Angels: A Gallery of Wood & Linoleum Cuts by Twenty Artists Accompanied by a Tale as Told to Jules Remedios Faye. (1999) (With Chris Stern)
 The Ladies Printing Bee: An Anthology of Thirty-Nine Letterpress Printers Addressing the Subject of Women’s Work. (1995) (Intro by Sandra Kroupa)
 The Annunciation: An Allegorical Tale of the Virgin as Warrior & Protectress: To Be Used as a Portable Alter. (1993)
 The Mechanical Dreamer: Il Sognatore Meccanico : A Fabulous Tale of Italian Dreams Told in Linoblocks Cut During the Perseid Meteor Showers (1993)
 Water Dogs (1992)

References

External links
 http://www.sternandfaye.com/
 ABC: Artists' Books Confab at Shoreline Community College Galley (2014)
 Beronä, David A. "Artists Without Authors: The Wordless Novels of Helena Bochorakova, Babette Katz, Barabara Henry, and Jules Remedios Faye." The California Printmaker: The Journal of the California Society of Printmakers (2002)
 Berry, John D. "TypeCon Port L'ampersand." Easily Amused (September 19, 2013)
 Berry, John D. "dot-font: Letterpress in the Digital Age." CreativePro.com (March 1, 2004)
 Freeman, Brad. "NW Tour, Books Received / Brief Reviews, Etc." J.A.B. No. 6, Fall (1996)
 Gilovich, Paula. "Dedicated Type: the Story of a Really Small Press." The Stranger (June 17, 1999)
 Richardson, Margaret. "The Printing Farm." U&lc: Volume 25, No. 2, Fall (1998)
 School of Visual Concepts Instructor Info
 TypeCon Speaker Profile

1958 births
Living people
21st-century American writers
American editors
American women artists
Women book artists
Book artists
American printers
American book publishers (people)
21st-century American women writers
Letterpress printmakers